Disilane is a chemical compound with chemical formula Si2H6 that was identified in 1902 by Henri Moissan and Samuel Smiles (1877–1953).  Moissan and Smiles reported disilane as being among the products formed by the action of dilute acids on metal silicides.  Although these reactions had been previously investigated by Friedrich Woehler and Heinrich Buff between 1857 and 1858, Moissan and Smiles were the first to explicitly identify disilane.  They referred to disilane as silicoethane.  Higher members of the homologous series SinH2n+2 formed in these reactions were subsequently identified by Carl Somiesky (sometimes spelled "Karl Somieski") and Alfred Stock. 

At standard temperature and pressure, disilane is a colourless, acrid gas. Disilane and ethane have similar structures, although disilane is much more reactive.  Other compounds of the general formula Si2X6 (X = hydride, halide, alkyl, aryl, and mixtures of these groups) are called disilanes. Disilane is a group 14 hydride.

Synthesis
Disilane is usually prepared by the hydrolysis of magnesium silicide.  This reaction produces silane, disilane, and even trisilane.  The method has been abandoned for the production of silane, but it remains viable for generating disilane.  The presence of traces of disilane is responsible for the spontaneous flammability of silane produced by hydrolysis by this method (analogously diphosphine is often the spontaneously pyrophoric contaminant in samples of phosphine).

It also arises by thermal decomposition disilane via both photochemical and thermal decomposition of silane.

The reduction of Si2Cl6 with lithium aluminium hydride affords disilane in modest yield.

Applications and reactions
Disilane and silane thermally decompose around 640 °C, depositing amorphous silicon.  This chemical vapor deposition process is relevant to the manufacture of photovoltaic devices.  Specifically it is utilized in the production of silicon wafers.

More generally, diorganosilanes are produced by reductive coupling of silyl chlorides, e.g.
 2 (CH3)3SiCl  +  2 Na  →  (CH3)3Si-Si(CH3)3  +  2 NaCl

Disilane gas can be used to control pressure of Si vapors during process of graphene growth by thermal decomposition of SiC. Pressure of Si vapors influences quality of produced graphene.

References

Silanes
Industrial gases
Substances discovered in the 1900s